Alžběta Dufková (born 19 April 1990) is a Czech synchronized swimmer who competed in both the 2008 Summer Olympics, 2012 Summer Olympics and 2016 Summer Olympics.  She competed with Soňa Bernadová at all three Olympics.

References 

1990 births
Living people
Czech synchronized swimmers
Olympic synchronized swimmers of the Czech Republic
Synchronized swimmers at the 2008 Summer Olympics
Synchronized swimmers at the 2012 Summer Olympics
Synchronized swimmers at the 2016 Summer Olympics
Sportspeople from Brno
Synchronized swimmers at the 2017 World Aquatics Championships
Artistic swimmers at the 2019 World Aquatics Championships
20th-century Czech women
21st-century Czech women